The Northern Steam Ship Company Ltd (NSS) served the northern half of the North Island of New Zealand from 1881 to 1974. Its headquarters, the Northern Steam Ship Company Building, remains in use on Quay St, Auckland as a bar.

Origins 
Initially there were very few roads and they were muddy and narrow, so a constant theme in early papers was a demand from small coastal settlements for a regular shipping service to link them with the major ports. For example, in 1874 a steamer service from Onehunga to Raglan and Port Waikato was given a subsidy by Auckland Province.

Capt. Alexander McGregor had the steam ship Rowena built in Auckland in 1872. He joined with a syndicate of owners to run the Argyle, Iona, Glenelg, Staffa, Rowena, Fingal and Katikati, as Auckland Steam Packet Co. ASP went into liquidation in 1878 due to losses on a ship for the Fiji trade, the SS Llewellyn. On 10 January 1878 ASP had sold Southern Cross for £7000, Go-Ahead for £2500, Pretty Jane for £2350 and the Cantera hulk and her coal for £384, to what was described as a newly-formed Auckland company.

On 11 May 1881 nineteen businessmen, including some of the syndicate, formed NSS, buying the ASP's ships. Thomas Morrin, David Cruickshank, Alexander McGregor, Thomas Ball, James Macfarlane and James McCosh Clark were the first directors.

NSS paid a 10% dividend in its first year and started acquiring extra ships. The 256 ton Macgregor entered service in September 1881. In 1883 Capt. McGregor went to Britain to buy new steamers for the Tauranga and Russell routes. In 1884 NSS Clansman and Gairloch (wrecked in 1903 and remaining on the beach at Oakura) arrived. In 1886 the Waimarie was one of the first to have electric lighting.

NSS was  also active in opening up new ports, such as at Te Puke in 1881 and ports north of Whangarei in 1893.

1887–1921 
On 6 June 1888 Capt. McGregor was replaced as manager by Charles Ranson. He retired in 1921, after greatly expanding the company.

1887 industrial dispute 
By 1887 the depression was affecting the company and wages and overtime pay were cut, and seamen who objected were replaced with non-unionists. In response the Federated Seamen's Union formed the co-operative Jubilee Steam Ship Co, competing on the northern and Waitara routes. It wasn't expected to succeed, but, between September 1887 and October 1888, the FSU claimed that Jubilee lost £14,000 and NSS £22,000. It also caused another company to withdraw from the west coast, which in the end was helpful to NSS. When Ranson took over, one of his first acts was to re-engage all the FSU members, though he also cut staff. He remained a lifelong friend of the union boss, John A. Millar, and received an award from staff in 1897 for his considerate attitude to them. However, in the 1913 Great Strike, NSS backed a ‘scab’ union (the Auckland Seamen and Firemen's Union).

Charles Ranson, manager 

Charles Ranson was born, in Ipswich  about 1850. He emigrated in 1876, managed an auctioneering and shipping business in Hawera, then went to Auckland as an accountant in 1881. In 1887, he was about to return to England, when NSS director, James McCosh Clark, mentioned that the board had decided to wind up the company. When Charles took over NSS had 8 (or 9) vessels, and 100 employees. When he retired, in July 1921, NSS had 40 vessels and 850 employees. Cargo had increased from 51,000 tons a year to 220,000 and passengers from 39,000 to 190,000.

After his appointment, NSS bought some second-hand screw-steamers, the Rotomahana, Waiotahi and Ohinemuri and small paddle steamers, Te Aroha and Enterprise, to work on the Waihou River. This got rid of another competitor, Hauraki Steamship Co, who sold out to NSS. Much of the expansion of the company was by takeovers. In 1906 NSS took over Kaipara Harbour ferries.

The company slowly recovered from its near liquidation. Until 2½% was paid in 1890, no dividends had been paid since 1881, but then 5% was paid in 1891, 6% 1892-6, 7% in 1897 and for many years, and 8% in 1925. 5% was paid in 1944.

By 1895 NSS was asking for urgent extension of its wharf space at Auckland to serve its growth.

Charles was also a steward of the Auckland Racing Club, an enthusiastic bowler, keenly interested in regattas and a church warden. He lived in Bassett Rd, Remuera, where he died on 13 January 1925.

Capt. Hammond took over as manager in 1921.

The Northern Steam Ship Company Building, Quay St 

Charles Ranson commissioned Arthur P. Wilson to design the £6000 (or £5000) building opposite the wharf used by their steamers, on newly reclaimed land, leased from Auckland Harbour Board (AHB). In 1899 NSS moved from Palmerston Buildings on Queen St to their new 2-storey brick building with dark green joinery, a public office, manager's office, space for other staff, telephone room and a boardroom. It had high ceilings and on each level the floor above was supported by cast iron columns. On Quay St a central door, gave access to the main office and floor above, and an eastern door accessed the wharves (now Marsden Wharf) and warehouse to the rear of the building. A boardwalk allowed passengers to cross to the steamers without walking through mud. A third floor was added in 1921 to provide accommodation and a laundry. In the 1940s many of the original features were lost. Originally the building stood alone. The land on the other side the building was their yard until the 1950s when AHB roofed it over as a garage in an attempt to compete with trucking firms. When NSS ceased trading, the building reverted to AHB. In July 1988 the Historic Places Trust listed it as "Category 1". It is now a bar.

Decline 

NSS gradually succumbed to rail and road competition.

When the North Island Main Trunk (NIMT) opened in 1908 between Auckland and Wellington, New Plymouth passenger traffic dropped. NSS and Union Steam Ship agreed there wasn't enough traffic for two steamers and formed a joint service. In 1925 opening of the railway to Whangarei cut passenger traffic and required reductions of fares and freight rates. and the Onerahi passenger service ended on 24 September 1926. Bus competition saw the Waiuku ferry end on 11 April 1928, with a cargo replacement for a short time. The completion of the railway to Tauranga in 1927 brought about an end to trains connecting with the steamer, complaints of undercutting and an end to the passenger service on 2 April 1929. The Onehunga-New Plymouth passenger service closed on 3 May 1930, a few years after a bus service had started on the upgraded State Highway 3 (SH 3). Rail competition was also cited as the reason to end the passenger service to Russell in 1931. In 1932 dairy company shareholders at Whakatane responded to a threat to close the railway by instructing the company to transfer its freight from NSS to the railway. The  Auckland-Paeroa passenger service lasted until 1937. In 1937 passenger services still ran to Algies, Coromandel, Great Barrier, Matakana, Mahurangi, One Tree Point, Waiheke, Warkworth and Whangarei. In 1938 SS Kawau was advertised as running summer weekend excursions to Waiheke. By 1939 the only remaining passenger steamer was Hauiti.

Auckland registered ships dropped from 226 in 1904 to 55 in 1944 and their tonnage from 20,546 to 5,627. In 1902 NSS had 28 ships totalling 6000 tons and costing an average of £34 per ton.

1945–1974 

By 1945 NSS was down to 10 ships, ranging from 56 to 351 tons. NSS had lost most of its trade to road and rail, so switched to inter-island trade, which it gradually lost to Cook Strait ferries from the 1960s, when it increasingly turned to coal and grain, including some trade with Australia, before losing out to natural gas conversions, a shipwreck (Maranui), trade fluctuations and reliance on the grain trade, which faltered due to a poor harvest in 1974.

NSS briefly tried replacing a ship with a partly owned trucking company, when it closed its Paeroa service in 1947.

After the war NSS switched from serving the northern ports to linking some of them to South Island. This required increasingly larger ships, so NSS bought Apanui (1948–61), Tainui (1949–63), Hotunui (1950–67), Ratanui (1952-56), and then started building Maranui (1953–68), Maunganui (1955–71), Poranui (1956–69) and Tawanui (1959–73), Moanui (1961–66), Awanui (1962-73). A major contract in this period was shipping materials for the Manapouri Tunnel. A second Moanui (1967–75) and Seaway Princess (1967–69) were added to the fleet, the latter for a weekly Onehunga - Lyttelton ro-ro service. However, as AHB didn't build a ramp at Onehunga, she had to use the only one at Auckland, sharing it with Union Steam Ship, which had priority, hence her short service with NSS.

By 1970 three of the remaining five ships were carrying bulk grain from South Island to Auckland, Tauranga, and, less often, Wellington, New Plymouth and Whanganui. By 1971 Awanui was the only general cargo vessel, running an Onehunga - Bluff - Jackson Bay round trip, but she was also adapted to carry grain in 1972. NSS added the 1562 ton Tainui II (1973–76), but there was a poor grain harvest and all three ships were soon idle. Tainui II's last voyage brought coal to Auckland from Westport on 6 November 1974, Moanui 12 days later (or another account says her last cargo was barley from the South Island to Auckland in September) from Dunedin and Dido, the last NSS ship ever to berth, arrived on Sunday 8 December 1974. The ships took a while to sell and for a few years NSS continued operating forklifts and being an agent for the Japan Line.

References

External links

 Timetables (showing ships and ports) - Dec 1881, Feb 1884, Jan 1911, Nov 1928
 Map of routes about 1910
 Photographs - Auckland wharf 1911; Clansman at Russell 1898, 1902; Gairloch; Kia Ora; Motu at Whitianga 1920s;  Taniwha at Auckland c.1905 (NSS Building in background); Terranora at Thames c.1896; Wakatere c.1930
 Paintings - Gairloch
 Fleet list
 Apanui - 1905 launch
 Aupouri and Ngatiawa - 1904 order for sister ships
 Clansman - account of delivery voyage of 1884, Russell Museum articles and, photo in Mangonui Heritage Trail
 Kopu - preserved at Paeroa Maritime Park, salvage attempts, Maritime Museum page
 Matuku steam tug sunk on Waihou River in 1906 at Te Aroha, 1889 advert, towed barges
 Rarawa - 1903 launch  speed trials, delivery voyage,, 1st visit to New Plymouth, 1937 scrapping, 1941 engines in naval trawler
 Rowena - 1872 launch
 Taniwha - 1897 launch, Long years on Paeroa Run, scrapped 1939
 Waimarie - 1896 launch, maiden voyage
 Advert for Far North, New Plymouth and Grand Summer Pleasure Cruise
 Tauranga ledgers 1927-43

Shipping companies of New Zealand
New Zealand companies established in 1881
Transport companies established in 1881